Väinö Kokkinen (25 November 1899 – 27 August 1967) was a Finnish Greco-Roman wrestler. He won two Olympic gold medals in the middleweight category, in 1928 and 1932, and finished in fourth place in 1936. Between 1925 and 1933 he won one gold and four silver medals at the European championships as well as six national titles (1926, 1929–32 and 1934).

Kokkinen was a blacksmith by profession and fought in the Finnish Civil War. He started training in wrestling in 1921, after moving to Helsinki. He retired in 1936 and ran a successful business in the clothing and hospitality industry. In the 1940s he was also a board member of the sports club Helsingin Jyry.

References

External links
 

1899 births
1967 deaths
People from Hollola
People from Häme Province (Grand Duchy of Finland)
Finnish male sport wrestlers
Wrestlers at the 1928 Summer Olympics
Wrestlers at the 1932 Summer Olympics
Wrestlers at the 1936 Summer Olympics
Olympic gold medalists for Finland
Olympic medalists in wrestling
Medalists at the 1932 Summer Olympics
Medalists at the 1928 Summer Olympics
Sportspeople from Päijät-Häme
19th-century Finnish people
20th-century Finnish people